Lohbach may refer to:

 Lohbach, a small river of North Rhine-Westphalia, Germany, tributary of the Wupper
 Lohbach (Elbbach), a river of Hesse, Germany
 Lohbach (Inn), a stream in Innsbruck, Austria